Restos is a 2012 film directed by Alfonso Pineda Ulloa, written by Alfonso Pineda Ulloa, Blas Valdez and Ernesto Walker and starring Leonardo Sbaraglia, Ilse Salas and Manolo Cardona.

Cast 
 Leonardo Sbaraglia as Daniel
 Ilse Salas as Elena
 Manolo Cardona as Luis
 Amorita Rasgado as Hotel Housekeeper
 Carolina Guerra
 Omar Ceballos as Snob gallery
 Xavier Sodi

Release 
Restos was released on March 8, 2012.

References

External links